Federal Route 82, or Jalan Paluh Hinai-Pekan and Jalan Batu Balik, is a federal road in Pahang, Malaysia. The roads connects Paluh Hinai in the west to Pekan in the east.

Route background
The Kilometre Zero of the Federal Route 82 starts at Pekan, at its junctions with the Federal Route 3, the main trunk road of the east coast of Peninsular Malaysia.

Features

Kampung Sungai Keladi, the birthplace of Tun Abdul Razak, second Malaysian Prime Minister

At most sections, the Federal Route 82 was built under the JKR R5 road standard, with a speed limit of  90 km/h.

List of junctions

References

Malaysian Federal Roads